Jehan Soulas (died before 1542) was an early 16th century French sculptor, working in both the Gothic and Renaissance styles. He made several sculpted groups for the choir wall of Chartres Cathedral.

References

External links (in French) 
 Académie d'Orléans - Fiche enseignant : Tour du chœur de la cathédrale de Chartres - L'Annonciation (Jehan Soulas) 
 Archives départementales d'Eure-et-Loir : Contrat avec le sculpteur Jehan Soulas pour l'ornementation du chœur

16th-century French sculptors
Sculptors from Paris
French Renaissance sculptors
Year of birth unknown
Year of death unknown